The Million Dollar Handicap is a 1925 American silent sports drama film directed by Scott Sidney and starring Edmund Burns, Ralph Lewis, and Ward Crane. It is based on the 1902 novel Thoroughbreds by William Alexander Fraser. The film was released in Britain the following year under the alternative title The Pride of the Paddock.

Plot
As described in a film magazine review, John Porter, a Southern horse breeder, is tricked into buying a doped filly named Dixie. His daughter Alis discovers that the horse can actually run. Her sweetheart George Mortimer, a cashier at the bank, shields her brother Alan after the latter embezzles some funds, and George is discharged. Alis' father suffers a paralytic stroke and is in financial difficulties. Alis disguises herself as a jockey and rides her despised horse in a $10,000 handicap race and wins. The excitement of the victory cures the father, her unjustly accused sweetheart George is cleared of any charges, and the two are happy together.

Cast
 Edmund Burns as George Mortimer
 Ralph Lewis as John Porter
 Ward Crane as Phillip Crane
 Tom Wilson as Tom
 Clarence Burton as Langdon
 Danny Hoy as Jockey
 Rosa Gore as Marilda Porter
 Ralph Emerson as Alan Porter
 Lon Poff as Milkman
 Vera Reynolds as Alis Porter

References

Bibliography
 Connelly, Robert B. The Silents: Silent Feature Films, 1910-36, Volume 40, Issue 2. December Press, 1998.
 Munden, Kenneth White. The American Film Institute Catalog of Motion Pictures Produced in the United States, Part 1. University of California Press, 1997.

External links

1925 films
1925 drama films
1920s English-language films
American silent feature films
American sports drama films
American horse racing films
1920s sports drama films
Films based on Canadian novels
Films directed by Scott Sidney
American black-and-white films
Producers Distributing Corporation films
1920s American films
Silent American drama films
Silent sports drama films